Roger Chassat (born 7 January 1963) is a French sports shooter. He competed in two events at the 1996 Summer Olympics.

References

External links
 

1963 births
Living people
French male sport shooters
Olympic shooters of France
Shooters at the 1996 Summer Olympics
People from Bitche
Sportspeople from Moselle (department)